The Jackson Family Honors is a 1994 Jackson family reunion television special, starring Michael Jackson, tribute honorees Elizabeth Taylor and Berry Gordy, and celebrity guests performers.  It was billed as a humanitarian event to raise money for charities. The musical benefit was filmed on February 19, 1994 at the MGM Grand in Las Vegas.  It was broadcast on February 22, 1994 on NBC.

Description 
The show was intended as a charity event with proceeds going to Los Angeles earthquake relief charities and the American Red Cross, amongst others. It was the hope of the Jackson family and Gary Smith, the producer, that NBC would make the event a yearly television special. The show was Michael's first stage appearance since he cancelled the remainder of his worldwide tour in November.

The show was initially scheduled for December 11, 1993 in Atlantic City.  It was rescheduled by NBC for February in Las Vegas.

Over 20 members of the Jackson family sang "Goin' back to Indiana". Celine Dion, Smokey Robinson, Dionne Warwick, Gladys Knight, Paul Rodriguez, and Bruce Hornsby were among the performers.

The musical benefit was filmed on February 19, 1994 at the MGM Grand in Las Vegas. While ticket prices were reduced after the show was rescheduled, of the twelve thousand tickets sold, fans paid as high as $1,000 each. 250 reporters showed up.

After two hours of live performances and videos of Michael Jackson, Michael appeared and was given a standing ovation which lasted five minutes.  He presented lifetime achievement awards to Berry Gordy, founder of Motown Records, and Elizabeth Taylor, for her work for on behalf of AIDS patients. He said to the audience "I love you.  Love, loyalty and friendship."

Michael joined the Jackson family and celebrity guests for the finale song "If You Only Believe".

Litigation 
After the show ended up losing money, producers Smith-Hemion filed a breach of contract lawsuit against members of the Jackson family, claiming that they were promised Michael Jackson would perform solo, saying the problems began when Michael cancelled his performance for the original November 1993 date, and unpaid bills. Michael testified he only agreed to appear onstage, not to perform. In 1996, after confusion amongst the jurors, U.S. District Judge Laughlin Waters declared a mistrial.

Cast 
Michael Jackson

Quincy Jones

Elizabeth Taylor

Berry Gordy

3T

Boyz II Men

Cindera Che

Celine Dion

Aretha Franklin

Louis Gossett, Jr.

Bruce Hornsby

Brandi Jackson

Jackie Jackson

Janet Jackson

Jermaine Jackson

Joe Jackson

Katherine Jackson

Marlon Jackson

Randy Jackson

Rebbie Jackson

Taj Jackson

Taryll Jackson

Tito Jackson

TJ Jackson

The Jacksons

Gladys Knight

Reba McEntire

Lisa Marie Presley

Smokey Robinson

Paul Rodriguez

Dionne Warwick

References 

1994 in American television
1994 television specials
1990s American television specials
Michael Jackson
Elizabeth Taylor
NBC television specials
Music television specials
Celine Dion
Dionne Warwick
Aretha Franklin
Quincy Jones